William Draheim was a member of the Wisconsin State Senate.

Biography
Draheim was born on December 15, 1898 in Neenah, Wisconsin. After graduating from Neenah High School, he attended Lawrence University. Draheim served in the United States Army and the Wisconsin Army National Guard, taking part in World War I and World War II and achieving the rank of major.

Political career
Draheim was a candidate for the Wisconsin State Assembly in 1938 as a Democrat and in 1948 as an Independent. In 1950, Draheim was elected to the Senate representing the 19th district as a Democrat. In following years, he was re-elected as a Republican. Additionally, he was a member of the Winnebago County, Wisconsin Board of Supervisors from 1938 to 1940 and again from 1948 to 1950. Draheim died on August 10, 1976 in Neenah, Wisconsin.

References

External links

The Political Graveyard

Politicians from Neenah, Wisconsin
County supervisors in Wisconsin
Wisconsin state senators
Wisconsin Democrats
Wisconsin Independents
Wisconsin Republicans
Military personnel from Wisconsin
National Guard (United States) officers
United States Army personnel of World War I
United States Army personnel of World War II
Lawrence University alumni
1898 births
1976 deaths
20th-century American politicians